Satish Kaul (8 September 1946 – 10 April 2021) was an Indian actor in both Punjabi and Hindi movies. He acted in over 300 Hindi and Punjabi films and worked with Bollywood actors such as Dev Anand, Dilip Kumar and Shahrukh Khan amongst others. His notable film roles included ones in Sassi Punnu, Ishq Nimana, Prem Parbat, Suhag Chooda and Patola.

Kaul won the "lifetime achievement" award for his contribution to Punjabi cinema at PTC Punjabi Film Awards 2011. He was regarded as one of the most successful regional film actors of all time. He was referred to as the "Amitabh Bachchan of Punjabi cinema".

Kaul died of COVID-19 on 10 April 2021.

Personal
Kaul started an acting school in Ludhiana, which lost money. His wife divorced him and left with their son to go to the United States.

Career facts

Kaul was first noticed as the romantic lead opposite Rehana Sultan in Ved Rahi's Prem Parbat (1973). He played the lead in a bunch of Hindi films such as Mere Satraj (1975) and Harfan Maula (1976). He also played character roles in many films including Dev Anand's Warrant (1975) and Subhash Ghai's Karma (1986).

Filmography

Hindi 
 Pyaar To Hona Hi Tha (1998)
 Aunty No. 1 (1998)
 Zanjeer (1998)
 Yaraana (1995) as Inspector
 Janam Kundli (1995) as Rajiv Sodhi
 Inteqam Ke Sholay (1995)
 Elaan (1994) as Vikas Chaudhry
 Pyar Hua Chori Chori (1991) as Jailor
 Khel (1992) as Vinod Mishra
 Bandh Darwaza (1990)
 Ram Lakhan (1989)
 Paanch Fauladi (1988)
 Janam Janam (1988) as Prakash
 Kabrastan (1988) as Inspector
 Commando (1988) as Satish - Chander's dad
 Hatya (1988) as Mohan
 Pyaar Ka Mandir (1988) as Satish
 Mardon Wali Baat (1988) as Inspector Deepak
 Khooni Mahal (1987)
 Dance Dance (1987) as Shyam
 Aag Hi Aag (1987) as Birju
 Inaam Dus Hazaar (1987) as Vikram Malhotra
 Karma (1986) as Sunil
 Ilzaam (1986) as Rahim Khan
 Anokha Modh (1985) as Mr. Ashok
 Shiva Ka Insaaf (1985) as Prakashnath
 Nek Parveen (1982) as Akter
 Sheetla Mata (1981) as Sarju
Garam Khoon (1980) as Inspector
 Bhakti Mein Shakti (1978) as Satish
 Harfan Maula (1976) as Mahesh
 Kasam (1976)
 Warrant (1975) as Dinesh
 Mere Sartaj (1975) as Javed Ahmed Gulrez
 Ang Se Ang Lagaley (1974)
 Dawat (1974)
 Faslah (1974) as Satish - Gautam's friend
 Prem Parbat (1973)

Punjabi 
 Aazaadi: The Freedom (2015)
 Proud to Be a Sikh (2014)
 Fer Mamla Gadbad Gadbad (2013)
 Saunh Menu Punjab Di (1991)
 Sheran De Putt Sher (1990)
 Jag Wala Mela (1988)
 Suhag Chooda (1988)
 Dhee Rani (1988)
 Maula Jatt (1988)
 Patola (1987) as Amar
 Yaar Gareeban Da (1986)
 Peengan Pyar Deeyan (1986)
 Babul Da Vehra (1985)
 Guddo (1985)
 Jeeja Sali (1985)
 Kunwara Jeeja (1985)
 Munda Naram Te Kudi Garam (1985)
 Maanwaan Thandian Chaanwan (1984)
 Veera (1984)
 Sassi Punnu (1983)
 Bhulekha (1983)
 Bagga Daku (1983) as Bagga Daku
 Jai Mata Chintpurni (1983)
 Vohti Hath Soti (1983)
 Angerjjan (1982)
 Chhammak Chhallo (1982)
 Jatt Da Gandasa (1982)
 Yaar Yaaran De (1982)
 Rano (1982)
 Do Posti (1981) (guest appearance)
 Lachhi (1981)
 Josh Jawani Da (1981)
 Jai Baba Balak Nath (1981)
 Ishq Nimana (1980) as Jeeta
 Gori Diyan Jhanjran (1980)
 Jatt Punjabi (1979)
 Mutiyaar (1979)
 Dera Aashiqan Da (1979)

TV Series 
 Mahabharata TV series ( 1988 ) Indradev
Vikram Aur Betaal 
 The Realization of Prince Anandsen (1988) as Yuvraj Anandsen
 The Love Story of Four Princes (1988) as Prince Ajay
 Love Is Eternal (1988) as Madhusudan
 Whom Will the Princess Marry? (1988) as The Vaid
 The Husband, the Thief, and the Lover (1988) as The Lover
 King Chandrasen and His Servant Satvasheel (1988) as Satvasheel
 Three Suitors and Somprabha (1988) as Shilpi
 The Story of Padmavati and Prince Vajramukti (1988) as Prince Vajramukti
 Love Story of King Yashodhan (1988) as Senapati
 King Vikramaditya and the Yogi/Suryamal and His Bride's Dilemma (1988) as Suryamal
 Dada Dadi Ki Kahaniyan (1986) as Madan Kumar

Awards
 Lifetime achievement award at PTC Punjabi Film Awards 2011

References

External links
 

1946 births
2021 deaths
Male actors in Hindi cinema
Male actors in Punjabi cinema
Cinema of Punjab
Kashmiri people
Indian male film actors
Deaths from the COVID-19 pandemic in India